Uzuntala is a village and municipality in the Qakh Rayon of Azerbaijan. It has a population of 122. The municipality consists of the villages of Uzuntala and Bağtala.

References 

Populated places in Qakh District